The Thirukkuvalai Port is a deep-water multi-modal port being developed as a part of an integrated port and power project in Nagapattinam, Tamil Nadu. It is being developed by Tridem Port & Power Company Pvt. Ltd. The entire project will entail an investment of about INR 100 billion with 45 billion in Phase I which includes 15 billion for the port development. The Port is designed to handle 40 Mtpa.

Development
The development will involve construction of breakwaters, construction of wharves / berths, and dredging the berthing areas, harbour basin, turning circle and the approach channel.

 Approximately  waterfront area with some  coastline.
 Reclaimed area from dredged materials extending outwards from the 3.
  coastline. Size of area is to be determined by Consultant.

References

Ports and harbours of Tamil Nadu